Cannabis in Argentina is decriminalized for personal use in small amounts and for consumption in private locations, the Supreme Court ruled in 2009.

Public consumption is generally accepted among young adults. Consumption for medical purposes is accepted but not legislated (only in private locations). Cultivating, selling and transporting large amounts is illegal and punishable by present laws.

Medical cannabis has been legal in Chubut since September 23, 2016, and in Santa Fe since November 30, 2016.

On March 29, 2017, the Argentine senate approved the medical use of CBD cannabis oil, and was promulgated on September 21, 2017. On 12 November 2020, President Alberto Fernández signed a decree legalizing the self-cultivation and regulating the sales and subsidized access of medical cannabis, expanding upon the 2017 bill.

References